The Challenger Deep is the deepest known point of the seabed of Earth, with a depth of  by direct measurement from deep-diving submersibles, remotely operated underwater vehicles and benthic landers, and (sometimes) slightly more by sonar bathymetry.

The Challenger Deep is located in the western Pacific Ocean, at the southern end of the Mariana Trench, near the Mariana Islands.
 This location is in the ocean territory of the Federated States of Micronesia.

The depression is named after the British Royal Navy survey ship , whose expedition of 1872–1876 made the first recordings of its depth. The high water pressure at this depth makes designing and operating exploratory craft difficult. The first descent by any vehicle was by Jacques Piccard and Don Walsh in the bathyscaphe Trieste in January 1960; unpiloted visits followed in 1996, 1998 and 2009. In March 2012, a solo descent was made by film director James Cameron in the deep-submergence vehicle Deepsea Challenger. Between 28 April and 4 May 2019, the  DSV Limiting Factor completed four crewed dives to the bottom of Challenger Deep. Between 6 June and 26 June 2020, the DSV Limiting Factor added six completed dives during the first Ring of Fire Expedition. The deep-sea submersible Fendouzhe (奋斗者, Striver) completed a crewed dive to the bottom of the Challenger Deep on 10 November 2020 with three scientists onboard whilst livestreaming the descent. Between 1 March and 13 April 2021, the DSV Limiting Factor's second Ring of Fire Expedition added five completed dives. During the third Ring of Fire Expedition in the summer of 2022, the DSV Limiting Factor made an additional nine descents to the Challenger Deep. As of July 2022, the list of people who descended to Challenger Deep includes twenty-seven people.

Topography

The Challenger Deep is a relatively small slot-shaped depression in the bottom of a considerably larger crescent-shaped oceanic trench, which itself is an unusually deep feature in the ocean floor.
Detailed sonar mapping of the western, center and eastern basins in June 2020 by the DSSV Pressure Drop combined with crewed descents revealed that they undulate with slopes and piles of rocks above a bed of pelagic ooze. This conforms with the description of Challenger Deep as consisting of an elongated seabed section with distinct sub-basins or sediment-filled pools.

Surveys and bathymetry

Over many years, the search for, and investigation of, the location of the maximum depth of the world's oceans has involved many different vessels, and continues into the twenty-first century.

The accuracy of determining geographical location, and the beamwidth of (multibeam) echosounder systems, limits the horizontal and vertical bathymetric sensor resolution that hydrographers can obtain from onsite data. This is especially important when sounding in deep water, as the resulting footprint of an acoustic pulse gets large once it reaches a distant sea floor. Further, sonar operation is affected by variations in sound speed, particularly in the vertical plane. The speed is determined by the water's bulk modulus, mass, and density. The bulk modulus is affected by temperature, pressure, and dissolved impurities (usually salinity).

1875 – HMS Challenger
In 1875, during her transit from the Admiralty Islands in the Bismarck Archipelago to Yokohama in Japan, the three-masted sailing corvette HMS Challenger attempted to make landfall at Spanish Marianas (now Guam), but was set to the west by "baffling winds" preventing them from "visiting either the Carolines or the Ladrones." Their altered path took them over the undersea canyon which later became known as the Challenger Deep. Depth soundings were taken by Baillie-weighted marked rope, and geographical locations were determined by celestial navigation (to an estimated accuracy of two nautical miles). One of their samples was taken within fifteen miles of the deepest spot in all of Earth's oceans. The serendipitous discovery of Earth's deepest depression by history's first major scientific expedition devoted entirely to the emerging science of oceanography, was incredibly good fortune, and especially notable when compared to the Earth's third deepest site (the Sirena Deep only 150 nautical miles east of the Challenger Deep), which would remain undiscovered for another 122 years.

1951 – SV HMS Challenger II
Seventy-five years later, the 1,140-ton British survey vessel HMS Challenger II, on her three-year westward circumnavigation of Earth, investigated the extreme depths southwest of Guam reported in 1875 by her predecessor, HMS Challenger. The Senior Scientist aboard Challenger II, Dr. Thomas F. Gaskell, recalled: [I]t took from ten past five in the evening until twenty to seven, that is an hour and a half, for the iron weight to fall to the sea-bottom. It was almost dark by the time the weight struck, but great excitement greeted the reading...In New Zealand, the Challenger II team gained the assistance of the Royal New Zealand Dockyard, "who managed to boost the echo sounder to record at the greatest depths". They returned to the "Marianas Deep" (sic) in October 1951. Using their newly improved echo sounder, they ran survey lines at right angles to the axis of the trench and discovered "a considerable area of a depth greater than " – later identified as the Challenger Deep's western basin. Navigational accuracy of several hundred meters was attained by celestial navigation and LORAN-A. Note that the term "Challenger Deep" came into use after this 1951–52 Challenger circumnavigation, and commemorates both British ships of that name involved with the discovery of the deepest basin of the world's oceans.

1957–1958 – RV Vityaz
She returned in 1958, Cruise #27, to conduct a detailed single beam bathymetry survey involving over a dozen transects of the Deep, with an extensive examination of the western basin and a quick peek into the eastern basin. The depths were considered statistical outliers, and a depth greater than 11,000 m has never been proven.

1959 – RV Stranger
The first definitive verification of both the depth and location of the Challenger Deep (western basin) was determined by Dr. R. L. Fisher from the Scripps Institution of Oceanography, aboard the 325-ton research vessel Stranger. Using explosive soundings, they recorded  at/near  in July 1959. Stranger used celestial and LORAN-C for navigation. Discrepancies between the geographical location (lat/long) of Stranger deepest depths and those from earlier expeditions (Challenger II 1951; Vityaz 1957 and 1958) "are probably due to uncertainties in fixing the ships' positions". Stranger north-south zig-zag survey passed well to the east of the eastern basin southbound, and well to the west of the eastern basin northbound, thus failed to discover the eastern basin of the Challenger Deep. This was an important gap in information, as the eastern basin was later reported as deeper than the other two basins.
The western basin received four transects by Stranger, recording depths of  toward the central basin, near where Trieste dove in 1960 (vicinity , and where Challenger II, in 1950, recorded . At the far western end of the western basin (about 142°11'E), the Stranger recorded , some 6 km south of the location where Vityaz recorded  in 1957–1958. Fisher stated: "differences in the Vitiaz [sic] and Stranger–Challenger II depths can be attributed to the [sound] velocity correction function used". 
The 1959 Stranger surveys of the Challenger Deep and of the Philippine Trench informed the U.S. Navy as to the appropriate site for Trieste record dive in 1960.

1962 – RV Spenser F. Baird
The Proa Expedition, Leg 2, returned Fisher to the Challenger Deep on 12–13 April 1962 aboard the Scripps research vessel Spencer F. Baird (formerly the steel-hulled US Army large tug LT-581) and employed a Precision Depth Recorder (PDR) to verify the extreme depths previously reported. They were chased off by a hurricane after only two days on-site. Once again, Fisher entirely missed the eastern basin of the Challenger Deep, which later proved to contain the deepest depths.

1975–1980 – RV Thomas Washington
The Scripps Institution of Oceanography deployed the 1,490-ton Navy-owned, civilian-crewed research vessel Thomas Washington (AGOR-10) to the Mariana Trench on several expeditions from 1975 to 1986. The first of these was the Eurydice Expedition, Leg 8 which brought Fisher back to the Challenger Deep's western basin from 28–31 March 1975. Thomas Washington established geodetic positioning by (SATNAV) with Autolog Gyro and EM Log. Bathymetrics were by a 12 kHz Precision Depth Recorder (PDR) with a single 60° beam. Five dredges were hauled 27–31 March, all into or slightly north of the deepest depths of the western basin. While Fisher missed the eastern basin of the Challenger Deep (for the third time), he did report a deep depression about 150 nautical miles east of the western basin. The 25 March dredge haul at  encountered , which pre-shadowed by 22 years the discovery of HMRG Deep/Sirena Deep in 1997.

On INDOPAC Expedition Leg 9, under chief scientist A. Aristides Yayanos, Thomas Washington spent nine days from 13–21 January 1977 conducting an extensive and detailed investigation of the Challenger Deep, mainly with biological objectives. "Echo soundings were carried out primarily with a 3.5 kHz single-beam system, with a 12 kHz echosounder operated in addition some of the time" (the 12 kHz system was activated for testing on 16 January). It was recovered on the 17th with excellent photography of amphipods (shrimp) from the Challenger Deep's western basin. Both the free traps and the pressure-retaining traps brought up good sample amphipods for study. While the ship briefly visited the area of the eastern basin, the expedition did not recognize it as potentially the deepest of the three Challenger Deep basins.
	
Thomas Washington returned briefly to the Challenger Deep on 17–19 October 1978 during Mariana Expedition Leg 5 under chief scientist James W. Hawkins. Another miss. On Mariana Expedition Leg 8, under chief scientist Yayanos, Thomas Washington was again involved, from 12–21 December 1978, with an intensive biological study of the western and central basins of the Challenger Deep. All of the 10,900-plus m recordings were in the western basin. The  depth was furthest east at 142°26.4' E (in the central basin), about 17 km west of the eastern basin. Again, focused efforts on the known areas of extreme depths (the western and central basins) were so tight that the eastern basin again was missed by this expedition.

From 20 to 30 November 1980, Thomas Washington was on site at the western basin of the Challenger Deep, as part of Rama Expedition Leg 7, again with chief-scientist Dr. A. A. Yayanos. Yayanos directed Thomas Washington in arguably the most extensive and wide-ranging of all single-beam bathymetric examinations of the Challenger Deep ever undertaken, with dozens of transits of the western basin, and ranging far into the backarc of the Challenger Deep (northward), with significant excursions into the Pacific Plate (southward) and along the trench axis to the east. The dredging and traps were for biological investigation of the bottom. Once again, other than a brief look into the eastern basin, all bathymetric and biological investigations were into the western basin.

1976–1977 – RV Kana Keoki

On Leg 3 of the Hawaii Institute of Geophysics' (HIG) expedition 76010303, the  research vessel Kana Keoki departed Guam primarily for a seismic investigation of the Challenger Deep area, under chief scientist Donald M. Hussong. The ship was equipped with air guns (for seismic reflection soundings deep into the Earth's mantle), magnetometer, gravimeter, 3.5 kHz and 12 kHz sonar transducers, and precision depth recorders. They ran the Deep from east to west, collecting single beam bathymetry, magnetic and gravity measurements, and employed the air guns along the trench axis, and well into the backarc and forearc, from 13 to 15 March 1976. Thence they proceeded south to the Ontong Java Plateau. Seismic information developed from this survey was instrumental in gaining an understanding of the subduction of the Pacific Plate under the Philippine Sea Plate. In 1977, Kana Keoki returned to the Challenger Deep area for wider coverage of the forearc and backarc.

1984 – SV Takuyo
The Hydrographic Department, Maritime Safety Agency, Japan (JHOD) deployed the newly commissioned 2,600-ton survey vessel Takuyo (HL 02) to the Challenger Deep 17–19 February 1984. Takuyo was the first Japanese ship to be equipped with the new narrowbeam SeaBeam multi-beam sonar echosounder, and was the first survey ship with multi-beam capability to survey the Challenger Deep. The system was so new that JHOD had to develop their own software for drawing bathymetric charts based on the SeaBeam digital data. In just three days, they tracked 500 miles of sounding lines, and covered about 140 km of the Challenger Deep with multibeam ensonification. Under chief scientist Hideo Nishida, they used CTD temperature and salinity data from the top  of the water column to correct depth measurements, and later conferred with Scripps Institution of Oceanography (including Fisher), and other GEBCO experts to confirm their depth correction methodology. In 1993, GEBCO recognized the  report as the deepest depth of the world's oceans. Technological advances such as improved multi-beam sonar would be the driving force in uncovering the mysteries of the Challenger Deep into the future.

1986 – RV Thomas Washington
The Scripps research vessel Thomas Washington returned to the Challenger Deep in 1986 during the Papatua Expedition, Leg 8, mounting one of the first commercial multi-beam echosounders capable of reaching into the deepest trenches, i.e. the 16-beam Seabeam "Classic". This allowed chief scientist Yayanos an opportunity to transit the Challenger Deep with the most modern depth-sounding equipment available. During the pre-midnight hours of 21 April 1986, the multibeam echosounder produced a map of the Challenger Deep bottom with a swath of about 5–7 miles wide. Yayanos noted: "The lasting impression from this cruise comes from the thoughts of the revolutionary things that Seabeam data can do for deep biology."

1988 – RV Moana Wave
On 22 August 1988, the U.S. Navy-owned 1,000-ton research vessel Moana Wave (AGOR-22), operated by the Hawaii Institute of Geophysics (HIG), University of Hawaii, under the direction of chief scientist Robert C. Thunell from the University of South Carolina, transited northwesterly across the central basin of the Challenger Deep, conducting a single-beam bathymetry track by their 3.5 kHz narrow (30-degs) beam echosounder with a Precision Depth Recorder. In addition to sonar bathymetry, they took 44 gravity cores and 21 box cores of bottom sediments.

1992 – RV Hakuhō Maru
The 3,987-ton Japanese research vessel Hakuhō Maru, an Ocean Research Institute – University of Tokyo sponsored ship, on cruise KH-92-5 cast three Sea-Bird SBE-9 ultra-deep CTD (conductivity-temperature-depth) profilers in a transverse line across the Challenger Deep on 1 December 1992. The other two CTDs were cast 19.9 km to the north and 16.1 km to the south. Hakuhō Maru was equipped with a narrow beam SeaBeam 500 multi-beam echosounder for depth determination, and had an Auto-Nav system with inputs from NAVSAT/NNSS, GPS, Doppler Log, EM log and track display, with a geodetic positioning accuracy approaching . When conducting CTD operations in the Challenger deep, they used the SeaBeam as a single beam depth recorder. There is a possibility that a depth exceeding  with a horizontal scale less than the beam width of measurements exists in the Challenger Deep.

1996 – RV Yokosuka
For most of 1995 and into 1996, the Japan Agency for Marine-Earth Science and Technology (JAMSTEC) employed the 4,439-ton Research Vessel Yokosuka to conduct the testing and workup of the 11,000-meter remotely-operated vehicle (ROV) Kaikō, and the 6,500 meter ROV Shinkai. It was not until February 1996, during Yokosuka cruise Y96-06, that Kaikō was ready for its first full depth dives. On this cruise, JAMSTEC established an area of the Challenger Deep (11°10'N to 11°30'N, by 141°50'E to 143°00'Ewhich later was recognized as containing three separate pools/basins en echelon, each with depths in excess of ) toward which JAMSTEC expeditions would concentrate their investigations for the next two decades. The Yokosuka employed a 151-beam SeaBeam 2112 12 kHz multibeam echosounder, allowing search swaths 12–15 km in width at  depth. The depth accuracy of Yokosuka Seabeam was about 0.1% of water depth (i.e. ±  for  depth). The ship's dual GPS systems attained geodetic positioning within double digit meter ( or better) accuracy.

1998, 1999 and 2002 – RV Kairei
Cruise KR98-01 sent JAMSTEC's two-year-old 4,517-ton Deep Sea Research Vessel RV Kairei south for a quick but thorough depth survey of the Challenger Deep, 11–13 January 1998, under chief scientist Kantaro Fujioka. Tracking largely along the trench axis of 070–250° they made five 80-km bathymetric survey tracks, spaced about 15 km apart, overlapping their SeaBeam 2112-004 (which now allowed sub-bottom profiling penetrating as much as 75 m below the bottom) while gaining gravity and magnetic data covering the entire Challenger Deep: western, central, and eastern basins.

Kairei returned in May 1998, cruise KR98-05, with ROV Kaikō, under the direction of chief scientist Jun Hashimoto with both geophysical and biological goals. Their bathymetric survey from 14–26 May was the most intensive and thorough depth and seismic survey of the Challenger Deep performed to date. Each evening, Kaikō deployed for about four hours of bottom time for biological-related sampling, plus about seven hours of vertical transit time. When Kaikō was onboard for servicing, Kairei conducted bathymetric surveys and observations. Kairei gridded a survey area about 130 km N–S by 110 km E–W. Kaikō made six dives (#71–75) all to the same location, (11°20.8' N, 142°12.35' E), near the  bottom contour line in the western basin.

In 1999, Kairei revisited the Challenger Deep during cruise KR99-06. The results of the 1998–1999 surveys include the first recognition that the Challenger Deep consists of three "right-stepping en echelon individual basins bounded by the  depth contour line. The size of [each of] the deeps are almost identical, 14–20 km long, 4 km wide". They concluded with the proposal "that these three individual elongated deeps constitute the 'Challenger Deep', and [we] identify them as the East, Central and West Deep. The depth was "obtained during swath mapping ... confirmed in both N–S and E-W swaths."

In 2002 Kairei revisited the Challenger Deep 16–25 October 2002, as cruise KR02-13 (a cooperative Japan-US-South Korea research program) with chief scientist Jun Hashimoto in charge; again with Kazuyoshi Hirata managing the ROV Kaikō team. The 2002 surveys of both the western and eastern basins were tight, with especially meticulous cross-gridding of the eastern basin with ten parallel tracks N–S and E–W less than 250 meters apart. On the morning of 17 October, ROV Kaikō dive #272 began and recovered over 33 hours later, with the ROV working at the bottom of the western basin for 26 hours (vicinity of 11°20.148' N, 142°11.774 E at ). Five Kaikō dives followed on a daily basis into the same area to service benthic landers and other scientific equipment, with dive #277 recovered on 25 October. Traps brought up large numbers of amphipods (sea fleas), and cameras recorded holothurians (sea cucumbers), White polychaetes (bristle worms), tube worms, and other biological species. During its 1998, 1999 surveys, Kairei was equipped with a GPS satellite-based radionavigation system. The United States government lifted the GPS selective availability in 2000, so during its 2002 survey, Kairei had access to non-degraded GPS positional services and achieved single-digit meter accuracy in geodetic positioning.

2001 – RV Melville

The 2.516-ton research vessel Melville, at the time operated by the Scripps Institution of Oceanography, took the Cook Expedition, Leg 6 with chief scientist Patricia Fryer of the University of Hawaii from Guam on 10 February 2001 to the Challenger Deep for a survey titled "Subduction Factory Studies in the Southern Mariana", including HMR-1 sonar mapping, magnetics, gravity measurements, and dredging in the Mariana arc region. They also gathered magnetic and gravity information, but no seismic data. Their primary survey instrument was the MR1 towed sonar, a shallow-towed 11/12 kHz bathymetric sidescan sonar developed and operated by the Hawaii Mapping Research Group (HMRG), a research and operational group within University of Hawaii's School of Ocean and Earth Science and Technology (SOEST) and the Hawaii Institute of Geophysics and Planetology (HIGP). The MR1 is full-ocean-depth capable, providing both bathymetry and sidescan data.

Leg 7 of the Cook Expedition continued the MR-1 survey of the Mariana Trench backarc from 4 March to 12 April 2001 under chief scientist Sherman Bloomer of Oregon State University.

2009 – RV Kilo Moana

In May/June 2009, the US Navy-owned 3,064-ton twin-hulled research vessel Kilo Moana (T-AGOR 26) was sent to the Challenger Deep area to conduct research. Kilo Moana is civilian-crewed and operated by SOEST. It is equipped with two multibeam echosounders with sub-bottom profiler add-ons (the 191-beam 12 kHz Kongsberg Simrad EM120 with SBP-1200, capable of accuracies of 0.2–0.5% of water depth across the entire swath), gravimeter, and magnetometer. The EM-120 uses 1 by 1 degree sonar-emissions at the sea surface. Navigation equipment includes the Applanix POS MV320 V4, rated at accuracies of 0.5–2 m. RV Kilo Moana was also used as the support ship of the hybrid remotely operated underwater vehicle (HROV) Nereus that dove three times to the Challenger Deep bottom during the May/June 2009 cruise and did not confirm the sonar established maximum depth by its support ship.

2009 – RV Yokosuka
Cruise YK09-08 brought the JAMSTEC 4,429-ton research vessel Yokosuka back to the Mariana Trough and to the Challenger Deep June–July 2009. Their mission was a two-part program: surveying three hydrothermal vent sites in the southern Mariana Trough backarc basin near 12°57'N, 143°37'E about 130 nmi northeast of the central basin of the Challenger Deep, using the autonomous underwater vehicle Urashima. AUV Urashima dives #90–94, were to a maximum depth of 3500 meters, and were successful in surveying all three sites with a Reson SEABAT7125AUV multibeam echosounder for bathymetry, and multiple water testers to detect and map trace elements spewed into the water from hydrothermal vents, white smokers, and hot spots. Kyoko OKINO from the Ocean Research Institute, University of Tokyo, was principal investigator for this aspect of the cruise.
The second goal of the cruise was to deploy a new "10K free fall camera system" called Ashura, to sample sediments and biologics at the bottom of the Challenger Deep. The principal investigator at the Challenger Deep was Taishi Tsubouchi of JAMSTEC. The 270 kg Ashura was equipped with multiple baited traps, a HTDV video camera, and devices to recover sediment, water, and biological samples (mostly amphipods at the bait, and bacteria and fungus from the sediment and water samples).

2010 – USNS Sumner
On 7 October 2010, further sonar mapping of the Challenger Deep area was conducted by the US Center for Coastal & Ocean Mapping/Joint Hydrographic Center (CCOM/JHC) aboard the 4.762-ton Sumner. The results were reported in December 2011 at the annual American Geophysical Union fall meeting.

2010 – RV Yokosuka
JAMSTEC returned Yokosuka to the Challenger Deep with cruise YK10-16, 21–28 November 2010. The chief scientist of this joint Japanese-Danish expedition was Hiroshi Kitazato of the Institute of Biogeosciences, JAMSTEC. The cruise was titled "Biogeosciences at the Challenger Deep: relict organisms and their relations to biogeochemical cycles". The Japanese teams made five deployments of their 11,000-meter camera system (three to 6,000 meters – two into the central basin of the Challenger Deep) which returned with 15 sediment cores, video records and 140 scavenging amphipod specimens. The Danish Ultra Deep Lander System was employed by Ronnie Glud et al on four casts, two into the central basin of the Challenger Deep and two to 6,000 m some 34 nmi west of the central basin.

2013 – RV Yokosuka
With JAMSTEC Cruises YK13-09 and YK13-12, Yokosuka hosted chief scientist Hidetaka Nomaki for a trip to New Zealand waters (YK13-09), with the return cruise identified as YK13-12. The project name was QUELLE2013; and the cruise title was: "In situ experimental & sampling study to understand abyssal biodiversity and biogeochemical cycles". They spent one day on the return trip at the Challenger Deep to obtain DNA/RNA on the large amphipods inhabiting the Deep (Hirondellea gigas). After an eight-hour, 46-minute stay at the bottom, they recovered some 90 individual Hirondellea gigas.

2014 – RV Kairei
JAMSTEC deployed Kairei to the Challenger Deep again 11–17 January 2014, under the leadership of chief scientist Takuro Nunora. The cruise identifier was KR14-01, titled: "Trench biosphere expedition for the Challenger Deep, Mariana Trench". The expedition sampled at six stations transecting the central basin, with only two deployments of the "11-K camera system" lander for sediment cores and water samples to "Station C" at the deepest depth, i.e. The other stations were investigated with the "Multi-core" lander, both to the backarc northward, and to the Pacific Plate southward. The 11,000-meter capable crawler-driven ROV ABIMSO was sent to 7,646 m depth about 20 nmi due north of the central basin (ABISMO dive #21) specifically to identify possible hydrothermal activity on the north slope of the Challenger Deep, as suggested by findings from Kairei cruise KR08-05 in 2008. AMISMO dives #20 and #22 were to 7,900 meters about 15 nmi north of the deepest waters of the central basin. Italian researchers under the leadership of Laura Carugati from the Polytechnic University of Marche, Italy (UNIVPM) were investigating the dynamics in virus/prokaryotes interactions in the Mariana Trench.

2014 – RV Falkor
From 16–19 December 2014, the Schmidt Ocean Institute's 2,024-ton research vessel Falkor, under chief scientist Douglas Bartlett from the Scripps Institution of Oceanography, deployed four different untethered instruments into the Challenger Deep for seven total releases. The Deep Sound 2 recorded the implosion of Deep Sound 3, providing a unique recording of an implosion within the Challenger Deep depression. In addition to the loss of the Deep Sound 3 by implosion, the lander ARI failed to respond upon receiving its instruction to drop weights, and was never recovered. On 16/17 December, Leggo was returned to the central basin baited for amphipods. On the 17th, RV Falkor relocated 17 nms eastward to the eastern basin, where they again deployed both the Leggo (baited and with its full camera load), and the Deep Sound 2. This reading was corrected to  depth. Leggo returned with good photography of amphipods feeding on the lander's mackerel bait and with sample amphipods. Falknor departed the Challenger Deep on 19 December en route the Marianas Trench Marine National Monument to the Sirena Deep. RV Falkor had both a Kongsberg EM302 and EM710 multibeam echosounder for bathymetry, and an Oceaneering C-Nav 3050 global navigation satellite system receiver, capable of calculating geodetic positioning with an accuracy better than  horizontally and  vertically.

2015 – USCGC Sequoia

From 10 to 13 July 2015, the Guam-based 1,930-ton US Coast Guard Cutter Sequoia (WLB 215) hosted a team of researchers, under chief scientist Robert P. Dziak, from the NOAA Pacific Marine Environmental Laboratory (PMEL), the University of Washington, and Oregon State University, in deploying PMEL's "Full-Ocean Depth Mooring", a 45-meter-long moored deep-ocean hydrophone and pressure sensor array into the western basin of the Challenger Deep. After 16 weeks, the moored array was recovered on 2–4 November 2015. "Observed sound sources included earthquake signals (T phases), baleen and odontocete cetacean vocalizations, ship propeller sounds, airguns, active sonar and the passing of a Category 4 typhoon." The science team described their results as "the first multiday, broadband record of ambient sound at Challenger Deep, as well as only the fifth direct depth measurement".

2016 – RV Xiangyanghong 09
The 3,536-ton research vessel Xiangyanghong 09 deployed on Leg II of the 37th China Cruise Dayang (DY37II) sponsored by the National Deep Sea Center, Qingdao and the Institute of Deep-Sea Science and Engineering, Chinese Academy of Sciences (Sanya, Hainan), to the Challenger Deep western basin area (11°22' N, 142°25' E) 4 June – 12 July 2016. As the mother ship for China's crewed deep submersible Jiaolong, the expedition carried out an exploration of the Challenger Deep to investigate the geological, biological, and chemical characteristics of the hadal zone. During the cruise, Jiaolong regularly deployed gas-tight samplers to collect water near the sea bottom.

2016 – RV Tansuo 01
From 22 June to 12 August 2016 (cruises 2016S1 and 2016S2), the Chinese Academy of Sciences' 6,250-ton submersible support ship Tansuo 1 (meaning: to explore) on her maiden voyage deployed to the Challenger Deep from her home port of Sanya, Hainan Island. The Tansuo 01 operated along the 142°30.00' longitude line, about 30 nmi east of the earlier DY37II cruise survey (see Xiangyanghong 09 above).

2016 – RV Sonne

In November 2016 sonar mapping of the Challenger Deep area was conducted by the Royal Netherlands Institute for Sea Research (NIOZ)/GEOMAR Helmholtz Centre for Ocean Research Kiel aboard the 8,554-ton Deep Ocean Research Vessel Sonne. The results were reported in 2017. The analysis of the sonar survey offered a  grid resolution at bottom depth, so small dips in the bottom that are less than that size would be difficult to detect from the 0.5 by 1 degree sonar-emissions at the sea surface. The horizontal position of the grid point has an uncertainty of ±, depending on along-track or across-track direction. (2014) study. The observed depth discrepancy with the 2010 sonar mapping and Gardner et al 2014 study are related to the application of differing sound velocity profiles, which are essential for accurate depth determination. Sonne used CTD casts about 1.6 km west of the deepest sounding to near the bottom of the Challenger Deep that were used for sound velocity profile calibration and optimization. Likewise, the impact of using different projections, datum and ellipsoids during data acquisition can cause positional discrepancies between surveys.

2016 – RV Shyian 3
This cruise was part of a $12 million Chinese-U.S. initiative, led by co-leader Jian Lin of the Woods Hole Oceanographic Institution; a 5-year effort (2017–2021) to image in fine detail the rock layers in and around the Challenger Deep.

2016 – RV Zhang Jian
The newly launched 4,800-ton research vessel (and mothership for the Rainbow Fish series of deep submersibles), the Zhang Jian departed Shanghai on 3 December. Their cruise was to test three new deep-sea landers, one uncrewed search submersible and the new Rainbow Fish 11,000-meter crewed deep submersible, all capable of diving to 10,000 meters. From 25 to 27 December, three deep-sea landing devices descended into the trench. The first Rainbow Fish lander took photographs, the second took sediment samples, and the third took biological samples. All three landers reached over 10,000 meters, and the third device brought back 103 amphipods. Cui Weicheng, director of Hadal Life Science Research Center at Shanghai Ocean University, led the team of scientists to carry out research at the Challenger Deep in the Mariana Trench. The ship is part of China's national marine research fleet but is owned by a Shanghai marine technology company.

2017 – RV Tansuo-1
CAS' Institute of Deep-sea Science and Engineering sponsored Tansuo-1 return to the Challenger Deep 20 January – 5 February 2017 (cruise TS03) with baited traps for the capture of fish and other macrobiology near the Challenger and Sirena Deeps. They also placed four or more CTD casts into the central and eastern basins of the Challenger Deep, as part of the World Ocean Circulation Experiment (WOCE).

2017 – RV Shinyo Maru
Tokyo University of Marine Science and Technology dispatched the research vessel Shinyo Maru to the Mariana Trench from 20 January to 5 February 2017 with baited traps for the capture of fish and other macrobiology near the Challenger and Sirena Deeps.

2017 – RV Kexue 3
Water samples were collected at Challenger Deep from 11 layers of the Mariana Trench in March 2017. Seawater samples from 4 to 4,000 m were collected by Niskin bottles mounted to a Seabird SBE25 CTDs; whereas water samples at depths from 6,050 m to 8,320 m were collected by a self-designed acoustic-controlled full ocean depth water samplers. In this study, scientists studied the RNA of pico- and nano-plankton from the surface to the hadal zone.

2017 – RV Kairei
JAMSTEC deployed Kairei to the Challenger Deep in May 2017 for the express purpose of testing the new full-ocean depth ROV UROV11K (Underwater ROV 11,000-meter-capable), as cruise KR 17-08C, under chief scientist Takashi Murashima. The cruise title was: "Sea trial of a full depth ROV UROV11K system in the Mariana Trench". UROV11K carried a new 4K High Definition video camera system, and new sensors to monitor the hydrogen-sulfide, methane, oxygen, and hydrogen content of the water. The rate of descent and drift is not available, but the ROV bottomed to the east of the deepest waters of the eastern basin as revealed by the ship's maneuvering on 14 May. Murashima then directed the Kairei to a location about 35 nmi east of the eastern basin of the Challenger Deep to test a new "Compact Hadal Lander" which made three descents to depths from 7,498 to 8,178 m for testing the Sony 4K camera and for photography of fish and other macro-biologics.

2018 – RV Shen Kuo
On its maiden voyage, the 2,150-ton twin-hulled scientific research vessel Shen Kuo (also Shengkuo, Shen Ko, or Shen Quo), departed Shanghai on 25 November 2018 and returned on 8 January 2019. They operated in the Mariana Trench area, and on 13 December tested a system of underwater navigation at a depth exceeding 10,000 metres, during a field trial of the Tsaihungyuy (ultra-short baseline) system. Project leader Tsui Veichen stated that, with the Tsaihungyuy equipment at depth, it was possible to obtain a signal and determine exact geolocations. The research team from Shanghai Ocean University and Westlake University was led by Cui Weicheng, director of Shanghai Ocean University's Hadal Science and Technology Research Center (HSRC).
The equipment to be tested included a piloted submersible (not full ocean depth – depth achieved not available) and two deep-sea landers, all capable of diving to depths of 10,000 meters, as well as an ROV that can go to 4,500 meters. They took photographs and obtained samples from the trench, including water, sediment, macro-organisms and micro-organisms. Cui says, "If we can take photos of fish more than 8,145 meters under water, ... we will break the current world record. We will test our new equipment including the landing devices. They are second generation. The first generation could only take samples in one spot per dive, but this new second generation can take samples at different depths in one dive. We also tested the ultra short baseline acoustic positioning system on the manned submersible, the future of underwater navigation."

2019 – RV Sally Ride

In November 2019, as cruise SR1916, a NIOZ team led by chief scientist Hans van Haren, with Scripps technicians, deployed to the Challenger Deep aboard the 2,641-ton research vessel , to recover a mooring line from the western basin of the Challenger Deep. The mooring line was deployed and left by the NIOZ team during the November 2016 RV Sonne expedition with the intention to be recovered in late 2018 by Sonne. The acoustic commanded release mechanism near the bottom of the Challenger Deep failed at the 2018 attempt. RV Sally Ride was made available exclusively for a final attempt to retrieve the mooring line before the release mechanism batteries expired. Sally Ride arrived at the Challenger Deep on 2 November. This time a 'deep release unit' lowered by one of Sally Ride winch-cables to around 1,000 m depth pinged release commands and managed to contact the near-bottom releases. After being submerged for nearly three years, mechanical problems occurred in 15 of the 395 temperature sensors. The first results indicate the occurrence of internal waves in the Challenger Deep.

Study of the depth and location of the Challenger Deep
Since May 2000, with the help of non-degraded signal satellite navigation, civilian surface vessels equipped with professional dual-frequency capable satellite navigation equipment can measure and establish their geodetic position with an accuracy in the order of meters to tens of meters whilst the western, central and eastern basins are kilometers apart.

In 2014, a study was conducted regarding the determination of the depth and location of the Challenger Deep based on data collected previous to and during the 2010 sonar mapping of the Mariana Trench with a Kongsberg Maritime EM 122 multibeam echosounder system aboard USNS Sumner. This study by James. V. Gardner et al. of the Center for Coastal & Ocean Mapping-Joint Hydrographic Center (CCOM/JHC), Chase Ocean Engineering Laboratory of the University of New Hampshire splits the measurement attempt history into three main groups: early single-beam echo sounders (1950s–1970s), early multibeam echo sounders (1980s – 21st century), and modern (i.e., post-GPS, high-resolution) multibeam echo sounders. Taking uncertainties in depth measurements and position estimation into account, the raw data of the 2010 bathymetry of the Challenger Deep vicinity consisting of 2,051,371 soundings from eight survey lines was analyzed. The depth measurement uncertainty is a composite of measured uncertainties in the spatial variations in sound-speed through the water volume, the ray-tracing and bottom-detection algorithms of the multibeam system, the accuracies and calibration of the motion sensor and navigation systems, estimates of spherical spreading, attenuation throughout the water volume, and so forth.

Both the RV Sonne expedition in 2016, and the RV Sally Ride expedition in 2019 expressed strong reservations concerning the depth corrections applied by the Gardner et al. study of 2014, and serious doubt concerning the accuracy of the deepest depth calculated by Gardner (in the western basin), of  after analysis of their multibeam data on a  grid. Dr. Hans van Haren, chief scientist on the RV Sally Ride cruise SR1916, indicated that Gardner's calculations were  too deep due to the "sound velocity profiling by Gardner et al. (2014)."

In 2018-2019, the deepest points of each ocean were mapped using a full‐ocean depth Kongsberg EM 124 multibeam echosounder aboard DSSV Pressure Drop. In 2021, a data paper was published by Cassandra Bongiovanni, Heather A. Stewart and Alan J. Jamieson regarding the gathered data donated to GEBCO. This depth closely agrees with the deepest point ( ±) determined by the Van Haren et al. sonar bathymetry. ( in the western basin). After analysis of their multibeam data on a  grid, the Bongiovanni et al. 2021 paper states the technological accuracy does not currently exist on low-frequency ship-mounted sonars required to determine which location was truly the deepest, nor does it currently exist on deep-sea pressure sensors.

In 2021, a study by Samuel F. Greenaway, Kathryn D. Sullivan, Samuel H. Umfress, Alice B. Beittel and Karl D. Wagner was published presenting a revised estimate of the maximum depth of the Challenger Deep based on a series of submersible dives conducted in June 2020. These depth estimates are derived from acoustic echo sounding profiles referenced to in-situ direct pressure measurements and corrected for observed oceanographic properties of the water-column, atmospheric pressure, gravity and gravity-gradient anomalies, and water-level effects. For this estimate, the error term is dominated by the uncertainty of the employed pressure sensor, but Greenaway et al. show that the gravity correction is also substantial. The Greenaway et al. study compares its results with other recent acoustic and pressure-based measurements for the Challenger Deep and concludes the deepest depth in the western basin is very nearly as deep as the eastern basin. The disagreement between the maximum depth estimates and their geodetic positions between post-2000 published depths however exceed the accompanying margins of uncertainty, raising questions regarding the measurements or the reported uncertainties.

Direct measurements
The 2010 maximal sonar mapping depths reported by Gardner et.al. in 2014 and Greenaway et al. study in 2021 have not been confirmed by direct descent (pressure gauge/manometer) measurements at full-ocean depth.Expeditions have reported direct measured maximal depths in a narrow range.
For the central basin the greatest reported depth is  ± by DSV Limiting Factor in June 2020.

Descents

Crewed descents

1960 – Trieste

On 23 January 1960, the Swiss-designed Trieste, originally built in Italy and acquired by the U.S. Navy, supported by the USS Wandank (ATF 204) and escorted by the USS Lewis (DE 535), descended to the ocean floor in the trench piloted by Jacques Piccard (who co-designed the submersible along with his father, Auguste Piccard) and USN Lieutenant Don Walsh. Their crew compartment was inside a spherical pressure vessel – measuring 2.16 metres in diameter suspended beneath a buoyancy tank 18.4 metres in length – which was a heavy-duty replacement (of the Italian original) built by Krupp Steel Works of Essen, Germany.
Their descent took almost five hours and the two men spent barely twenty minutes on the ocean floor before undertaking the three-hour-and-fifteen-minute ascent. Their early departure from the ocean floor was due to their concern over a crack in the outer window caused by the temperature differences during their descent.

Trieste dove at/near , bottoming at  ± into the Challenger Deep's western basin, as measured by an onboard manometer. Another source states the measured depth at the bottom was measured with a manometer at  ±.
Fisher noted that the Trieste'''s reported depth "agrees well with the sonic sounding."

2012 – Deepsea Challenger

On 26 March 2012 (local time), Canadian film director James Cameron made a solo descent in the DSV Deepsea Challenger to the bottom of the Challenger Deep.
At approximately 05:15 ChST on 26 March (19:15 UTC on 25 March), the descent began.
At 07:52 ChST (21:52 UTC), Deepsea Challenger arrived at the bottom. The descent lasted 2 hours and 36 minutes and the recorded depth was  when Deepsea Challenger touched down.
Cameron had planned to spend about six hours near the ocean floor exploring but decided to start the ascent to the surface after only 2 hours and 34 minutes. The time on the bottom was shortened because a hydraulic fluid leak in the lines controlling the manipulator arm obscured the visibility out the only viewing port. It also caused the loss of the submersible's starboard thrusters. At around 12:00 ChST (02:00 UTC on 26 March), the Deepsea Challenger website says the sub resurfaced after a 90-minute ascent, although Paul Allen's tweets indicate the ascent took only about 67 minutes. During a post-dive press conference Cameron said: "I landed on a very soft, almost gelatinous flat plain. Once I got my bearings, I drove across it for quite a distance ... and finally worked my way up the slope." The whole time, Cameron said, he didn't see any fish, or any living creatures more than an inch (2.54 cm) long: "The only free swimmers I saw were small amphipods" – shrimplike bottom-feeders.

2019 – Five Deeps Expedition / DSV Limiting Factor

The Five Deeps Expedition's objective was to thoroughly map and visit the deepest points of all five of the world's oceans by the end of September 2019. On 28 April 2019, explorer Victor Vescovo descended to the "Eastern Pool" of the Challenger Deep in the Deep-Submergence Vehicle Limiting Factor (a Triton 36000/2 model submersible). Between 28 April and 4 May 2019, the Limiting Factor completed four dives to the bottom of Challenger Deep. The fourth dive descended to the slightly less deep "Central Pool" of the Challenger Deep (crew: Patrick Lahey, Pilot; John Ramsay, Sub Designer). The gathered data was published with the caveat that it was subject to further analysis and could possibly be revised in the future. The data will be donated to the GEBCO Seabed 2030 initiative. Later in 2019, following a review of bathymetric data, and multiple sensor recordings taken by the DSV Limiting Factor and the ultra-deep-sea landers Closp, Flere and Skaff, the Five Deeps Expedition revised the maximum depth to  ±.

2020 – Ring of Fire Expedition / DSV Limiting Factor

Caladan Oceanic's "Ring of Fire" expedition in the Pacific included six crewed descents and twenty-five lander deployments into all three basins of the Challenger Deep all piloted by Victor Vescovo and further topographical and marine life survey of the entire Challenger Deep. The expedition craft used are the Deep Submersible Support Vessel DSSV Pressure Drop, Deep-Submergence Vehicle DSV Limiting Factor and the ultra-deep-sea landers Closp, Flere and Skaff.
During the first crewed dive on 7 June 2020 Victor Vescovo and former US astronaut (and former NOAA Administrator) Kathryn D. Sullivan descended to the "Eastern Pool" of the Challenger Deep in the Deep-Submergence Vehicle Limiting Factor.

On 12 June 2020, Victor Vescovo and mountaineer and explorer Vanessa O'Brien descended to the "Eastern Pool" of the Challenger Deep spending three hours mapping the bottom.
On 14 June 2020, Victor Vescovo and John Rost descended to the "Eastern Pool" of the Challenger Deep in the Deep-Submergence Vehicle Limiting Factor spending four hours at depth and transiting the bottom for nearly 2 miles.
On 20 June 2020, Victor Vescovo and Kelly Walsh descended to the "Western Pool" of the Challenger Deep in the Deep-Submergence Vehicle Limiting Factor spending four hours at the bottom. Kelly Walsh is the son of the Trieste's captain Don Walsh who descended there in 1960 with Jacques Piccard.
On 21 June 2020, Victor Vescovo and Woods Hole Oceanographic Institution researcher Ying-Tsong Lin descended to the "Central Pool" of the Challenger Deep in the Deep-Submergence Vehicle Limiting Factor. They reached a maximum depth of  ±.
On 26 June 2020 Victor Vescovo and Jim Wigginton descended to the "Eastern Pool" of the Challenger Deep in the Deep-Submergence Vehicle Limiting Factor.

2020 – FendouzheFendouzhe (奋斗者, Striver) is a crewed Chinese deep-sea submersible developed by the China Ship Scientific Research Center (CSSRC). Between 10 October and 28 November 28, 2020, it carried out thirteen dives in the Mariana Trench as part of a test programme. This makes the  Fendouzhe  the fourth crewed submersible vehicle achieving a successful descent. The pressure hull of Fendouzhe, made from a newly developed titanium alloy, offers space for three people in addition to technical equipment. Fendouzhe is equipped with cameras made by the Norwegian manufacturer Imenco.
According to Ye Cong 叶聪, the chief designer of the submersible, China's goals for the dive aren't just scientific investigation but also the future use of deep-sea seabed resources.

2021 – Ring of Fire 2 Expedition / DSV Limiting Factor

On 28 February 2021 Caladan Oceanic's "Ring of Fire 2" expedition arrived over the Challenger Deep and conducted crewed descents and lander deployments into the Challenger Deep. At the start the (uncrewed) ultra-deep-sea lander Skaff was deployed to collect water column data by CTD for the expedition. The effects of the Pacific subducting plate crashing into the Philippine Plate was among the things researched onsite.
On 1 March 2021, the first crewed descent to the eastern pool was made by Victor Vescovo and Richard Garriott. Garriott became the 17th person to descend to the bottom.
On 2 March 2021, a descent to the eastern pool was made by Victor Vescovo and Michael Dubno.
On 5 March a descent to the eastern pool was made by Victor Vescovo and Hamish Harding. They traversed the bottom of Challenger Deep.
On 11 March 2021 a descent to the western pool was made by Victor Vescovo and marine botanist Nicole Yamase.
On 13 April 2021 a descent was made by deep water submersible operations expert Rob McCallum and Tim Macdonald who piloted the dive.
A 2021 descent with a Japanese citizen is planned.
All crewed descents were conducted in the Deep-Submergence Vehicle DSV Limiting Factor.

2022 - Ring of Fire 3 Expedition / DSV Limiting Factor

In July 2022 for the fourth consecutive year, Caladan Oceanic's deep submergence system, consisting of the deep submersible DSV Limiting Factor supported by the mother ship DSSV Pressure Drop, returned to the Challenger Deep for dives into the Challenger Deep.
In early July 2022, Victor Vescovo was joined by Aaron Newman as a mission specialist for a dive into the Central pool. On 5 July 2022, Tim Macdonald as pilot and Jim Kitchen as mission specialist for a dive into the Eastern pool. On 8 July 2022 Victor Vescovo was joined by Dylan Taylor as mission specialist for a dive into the Eastern pool.
Wright operated the world's first sidescan sonar to ever operate at full-ocean depth to capture detailed imagery along short transects of the southern wall of the Western pool.

Uncrewed descents by ROVs

1996 and 1998 – Kaikō

The remotely operated vehicle (ROV) Kaikō made many uncrewed descents to the Mariana Trench from its support ship RV Yokosuka during two expeditions in 1996 and 1998.
From 29 February to 4 March the ROV Kaiko made three dives into the central basin, Kaiko #21 – Kaiko #23, . The Japanese robotic deep-sea probe Kaikō broke the depth record for uncrewed probes when it reached close to the surveyed bottom of the Challenger Deep.
The ROV Kaiko was the first vehicle to visit to the bottom of the Challenger Deep since the bathyscaph Trieste's dive in 1960, and the first success in sampling the trench bottom sediment/mud, from which Kaiko obtained over 360 samples. Approximately 3,000 different microbes were identified in the samples."Life Is Found Thriving at Ocean's Deepest Point" , National Geographic News, 3 February 2005Kaikō was lost at sea off Shikoku Island during Typhoon Chan-Hom on 29 May 2003.

2009 – Nereus

The Nereus team was headed by the Expedition Leader Andy Bowen of WHOI, Louis Whitcomb of Johns Hopkins University, and Dana Yoerger, also of WHOI. The expedition had co-chief scientists: biologist Tim Shank of WHOI, and geologist Patricia Fryer of the University of Hawaii, to head the science team exploiting the ship's bathymetry and organizing the science experiments deployed by the Nereus.

Dive #011ROV, on 31 May 2009, saw the Nereus piloted on a 27.8-hour underwater mission, with about ten hours transversing the eastern basin of the Challenger Deep – from the south wall, northwest to the north wall – streaming live video and data back to its mothership. The Nereus was successful in recovering both sediment and rock samples from the eastern and the western basins with its manipulator arm for further scientific analysis. Nereus thus became the first vehicle to reach the Mariana Trench since 1998 and the deepest-diving vehicle then in operation. Project manager and developer Andy Bowen heralded the achievement as "the start of a new era in ocean exploration". Nereus, unlike Kaikō, did not need to be powered or controlled by a cable connected to a ship on the ocean surface.

Uncrewed descents near the Challenger Deep

2008 – ABISMO

In June 2008, the Japan Agency for Marine-Earth Science and Technology (JAMSTEC) deployed the research vessel Kairei to the area of Guam for cruise KR08-05 Leg 1 and Leg 2.
The 2-m long gravity core sampler was dropped in free fall, and sediment samples of 1.6m length were obtained. Twelve bottles of water samples were also obtained at various depths..." ABISMO's dive #14 was into the TOTO caldera (12°42.7777 N, 143°32.4055 E), about 60 nmi northeast of the deepest waters of the central basin of the Challenger Deep, where they obtained videos of the hydrothermal plume. On 31 May 2009, the ABISMO was joined by the Woods Hole Oceanographic Institution's HROV Nereus as the only two operational full ocean depth capable remotely operated vehicles in existence. During the ROV ABISMO's deepest sea trails dive its manometer measured a depth of  ± in "Area 1" (vicinity of 12°43' N, 143°33' E).

Leg 2, under chief scientist Takashi Murashima, operated at the Challenger Deep 8–9 June 2008, testing JAMSTEC's new full ocean depth "Free Fall Mooring System," i.e. a lander.

2016 – Haidou-1

2020 – Vityaz-D

Lifeforms
The summary report of the  expedition lists radiolaria from the two dredged samples taken when the Challenger Deep was first discovered. These (Nassellaria and Spumellaria) were reported in the Report on Radiolaria (1887) written by Ernst Haeckel.

On their 1960 descent, the crew of the Trieste noted that the floor consisted of diatomaceous ooze and reported observing "some type of flatfish" lying on the seabed.

Many marine biologists are now skeptical of this supposed sighting, and it is suggested that the creature may instead have been a sea cucumber."James Cameron heads into the abyss" , Nature, 19 March 2012 The video camera on board the Kaiko probe spotted a sea cucumber, a scale worm and a shrimp at the bottom."The last frontier", Time, 14 August 1995 At the bottom of the Challenger Deep, the Nereus probe spotted one polychaete worm (a multi-legged predator) about an inch long.

While similar lifeforms have been known to exist in shallower ocean trenches (> 7,000 m) and on the abyssal plain, the lifeforms discovered in the Challenger Deep possibly represent taxa distinct from those in shallower ecosystems.

Most of the organisms collected were simple, soft-shelled foraminifera (432 species according to National Geographic), with four of the others representing species of the complex, multi-chambered genera Leptohalysis and Reophax''. Eighty-five per cent of the specimens were organic, soft-shelled allogromiids, which is unusual compared to samples of sediment-dwelling organisms from other deep-sea environments, where the percentage of organic-walled foraminifera ranges from 5% to 20%. As small organisms with hard, calcareous shells have trouble growing at extreme depths because of the high solubility of calcium carbonate in the pressurized water, scientists theorize that the preponderance of soft-shelled organisms in the Challenger Deep may have resulted from the typical biosphere present when the Challenger Deep was shallower than it is now. Over the course of six to nine million years, as the Challenger Deep grew to its present depth, many of the species present in the sediment died out or were unable to adapt to the increasing water pressure and changing environment.

On 17 March 2013, researchers reported data that suggested piezophilic microorganisms thrive in the Challenger Deep. According to one of the researchers, "You can find microbes everywherethey're extremely adaptable to conditions, and survive wherever they are."

See also

 Emden Deep
 Horizon Deep
 List of people who descended to Challenger Deep
 Litke Deep, closest point to Earth's center
 Sirena Deep (formerly HMRG Deep)

References

External links
 
 Mariana Trench
 Mariana Trench: Seven miles deep, the ocean is still a noisy place

Geology of the Pacific Ocean
Lowest points of the World Ocean
Landforms of Oceania